

Events

Pre-1600
 982 – King Otto II and his Frankish army are defeated by the Muslim army of al-Qasim at Cape Colonna, Southern Italy. 
1223 – Louis VIII becomes King of France upon the death of his father, Philip II.
1420 – Battle of Vítkov Hill, decisive victory of Czech Hussite forces commanded by Jan Žižka against Crusade army led by Sigismund, Holy Roman Emperor.
1430 – Joan of Arc, taken by the Burgundians in May, is handed over to Pierre Cauchon, the bishop of Beauvais.
1596 – Anglo-Spanish War: English and Dutch troops sack the Spanish city of Cádiz before leaving the next day.

1601–1900
1769 – An expedition led by Gaspar de Portolá leaves its base in California and sets out to find the Port of Monterey (now Monterey, California).
1771 – Foundation of the Mission San Antonio de Padua in modern California by the Franciscan friar Junípero Serra.
1789 – Storming of the Bastille in Paris. This event escalates the widespread discontent into the French Revolution. Bastille Day is still celebrated annually in France.
1790 – Inaugural Fête de la Fédération is held to celebrate the unity of the French people and the national reconciliation.
1791 – Beginning of Priestley Riots (to 17 July) in Birmingham targeting Joseph Priestley as a supporter of the French Revolution.
1798 – The Sedition Act of 1798 becomes law in the United States making it a federal crime to write, publish, or utter false or malicious statements about the United States government.
1808 – The Finnish War: the Battle of Lapua was fought.
1853 – Opening of the first major US world's fair, the Exhibition of the Industry of All Nations in New York City.
1865 – The first ascent of the Matterhorn is completed by Edward Whymper and his party, four of whom die on the descent.
1874 – The Chicago Fire of 1874 burns down 47 acres of the city, destroying 812 buildings, killing 20, and resulting in the fire insurance industry demanding municipal reforms from Chicago's city council.
1881 – American outlaw Billy the Kid is shot and killed by Sheriff Pat Garrett in the Maxwell House at Fort Sumner, New Mexico.
1900 – Armies of the Eight-Nation Alliance capture Tientsin during the Boxer Rebellion.

1901–present
1902 – The Campanile in St Mark's Square, Venice collapses, also demolishing the loggetta.
1911 – Harry Atwood, an exhibition pilot for the Wright brothers, is greeted by President Taft after he lands his aeroplane on the South Lawn of the White House, having flown from Boston.
1915 – Beginning of the McMahon–Hussein Correspondence between Hussein bin Ali, Sharif of Mecca and the British official Henry McMahon concerning the Arab Revolt against the Ottoman Empire.
1916 – Battle of Delville Wood begins as an action within the Battle of the Somme, lasting until 3 September 1916.
1933 – In a decree called the Gleichschaltung, Adolf Hitler abolishes all German political parties except the Nazis.
  1933   – Nazi eugenics programme begins with the proclamation of the Law for the Prevention of Hereditarily Diseased Offspring requiring the compulsory sterilization of any citizen who suffers from alleged genetic disorders.
1943 – In Diamond, Missouri, the George Washington Carver National Monument becomes the first United States National Monument in honor of an African American.
1948 – Palmiro Togliatti, leader of the Italian Communist Party, is shot and wounded near the Italian Parliament.
1950 – Korean War: beginning of the Battle of Taejon.
1951 – Ferrari take their first Formula One grand prix victory at the British Grand Prix at Silverstone.
1957 – Rawya Ateya takes her seat in the National Assembly of Egypt, thereby becoming the first female parliamentarian in the Arab world.
1958 – In the 14 July Revolution in Iraq, the monarchy is overthrown by popular forces led by Abd al-Karim Qasim, who becomes the nation's new leader.
1960 – Jane Goodall arrives at the Gombe Stream Reserve in present-day Tanzania to begin her study of chimpanzees in the wild.
1965 – Mariner 4 flyby of Mars takes the first close-up photos of another planet. The photographs take approximately six hours to be transmitted back to Earth.
1983 – Mario Bros. is released in Japan, beginning the popular Super Mario Bros franchise.
2002 – French president Jacques Chirac escapes an assassination attempt from Maxime Brunerie during a Bastille Day parade at Champs-Élysées.
2013 – Dedication of statue of Rachel Carson, a sculpture named for the environmentalist, in Woods Hole, Massachusetts.
2015 – NASA's New Horizons probe performs the first flyby of Pluto, and thus completes the initial survey of the Solar System.
2016 – A man ploughs a truck into a Bastille Day celebration in Nice, France, killing 86 people and injuring another 434 before being shot by police.

Births

Pre-1600
 926 – Murakami, emperor of Japan (d. 967)
1410 – Arnold, Duke of Guelders, (d. 1473)
1454 – Poliziano, Italian poet and scholar (d. 1494)
1515 – Philip I, Duke of Pomerania (d. 1560)

1601–1900
1602 – Cardinal Jules Mazarin, Italian-French cardinal and politician, chief minister of France from 5 December 1642 to 9 March 1661 (d. 1661)
1608 – George Goring, Lord Goring, English general (d. 1657)
1610 – Ferdinando II de' Medici, Grand Duke of Tuscany (d. 1670)
1634 – Pasquier Quesnel, French priest and theologian (d. 1719)
1671 – Jacques d'Allonville, French astronomer and mathematician (d. 1732)
1675 – Claude Alexandre de Bonneval, French general (d. 1747)
1696 – William Oldys, English historian and author (d. 1761)
1721 – John Douglas, Scottish bishop and scholar (d. 1807)
1743 – Gavrila Derzhavin, Russian poet and politician (d. 1816)
1755 – Michel de Beaupuy, French general (d. 1796)
1785 – Mordecai Manuel Noah, American journalist, playwright, and diplomat (d. 1851)
1801 – Johannes Peter Müller, German physiologist and anatomist (d. 1858)
1816 – Arthur de Gobineau, French writer who founded Gobinism to promote development of racism (d. 1882)
1829 – Edward Benson, English archbishop (d. 1896)
1859 – Willy Hess, German violinist and educator (d. 1928)
1861 – Kate M. Gordon, American activist (d. 1931)
1862 – Florence Bascom, American geologist and educator (d. 1945)
  1862   – Gustav Klimt, Austrian painter and illustrator (d. 1918)
1865 – Arthur Capper, American journalist and politician, 20th Governor of Kansas (d. 1951)
1866 – Juliette Wytsman, Belgian painter (d. 1925)
1868 – Gertrude Bell, English archaeologist and spy (d. 1926)
1872 – Albert Marque, French sculptor and doll maker (d. 1939)
1874 – Abbas II of Egypt (d. 1944)
  1874   – Crawford Vaughan, Australian politician, 27th Premier of South Australia (d. 1947)
1878 – Donald Meek, Scottish-American stage and film actor (d. 1946)
1885 – Sisavang Vong, Laotian king (d. 1959)
1888 – Scipio Slataper, Italian author and critic (d. 1915)
1889 – Marco de Gastyne, French painter and illustrator (d. 1982)
  1889   – Ante Pavelić, Croatian fascist dictator during World War II (d. 1959)
1893 – Clarence J. Brown, American publisher and politician, 36th Lieutenant Governor of Ohio (d. 1965)
  1893   – Garimella Satyanarayana, Indian poet and author (d. 1952)
1894 – Dave Fleischer, American animator, director, and producer (d. 1979)
1896 – Buenaventura Durruti, Spanish soldier and anarchist (d. 1936)
1897 – Plaek Phibunsongkhram, Thai military officer and politician, 3rd Prime Minister of Thailand (d. 1964)
1898 – Happy Chandler, American lawyer and politician, 49th Governor of Kentucky, second Commissioner of Baseball (d. 1991)

1901–present
1901 – Gerald Finzi, English composer and academic (d. 1956)
1903 – Irving Stone, American author and educator (d. 1989)
1907 – Chico Landi, Brazilian racing driver (d. 1989)
1910 – William Hanna, American animator, director, producer, and actor, co-founded Hanna-Barbera (d. 2001)
1911 – Pavel Prudnikau, Belarusian poet and author (d. 2000)
1912 – Woody Guthrie, American singer-songwriter and guitarist (d. 1967)
1913 – Gerald Ford, American commander, lawyer, and politician, 38th President of the United States (d. 2006)
1918 – Fred Baur, American chemist and founder of Pringles (d. 2008)
  1918   – Ingmar Bergman, Swedish director, producer, and screenwriter (d. 2007)
  1918   – Arthur Laurents, American director, screenwriter, and playwright (d. 2011)
  1918   – Jay Wright Forrester, American computer engineer and systems scientist (d. 2016)
1920 – Shankarrao Chavan, Indian lawyer and politician, Indian Minister of Finance (d. 2004)
1921 – Sixto Durán Ballén, American-Ecuadorian architect and politician, 48th President of Ecuador (d. 2016)
  1921   – Leon Garfield, English author (d. 1996)
  1921   – Armand Gaudreault, Canadian ice hockey player (d. 2013)
  1921   – Geoffrey Wilkinson, English chemist and academic, Nobel Prize laureate (d. 1996)
1922 – Robin Olds, American general and pilot (d. 2007)
  1922   – Elfriede Rinkel, German SS officer (d. 2018)
  1922   – Käbi Laretei, Estonian-Swedish concert pianist (d. 2014)
1923 – René Favaloro, Argentine surgeon and cardiologist (d. 2000)
  1923   – Dale Robertson, American actor (d. 2013)
  1923   – Robert Zildjian, American businessman, founded Sabian (d. 2013)
1924 – Warren Giese, American football player, coach, and politician (d. 2013)
1925 – Bruce L. Douglas, American politician
1926 – Wallace Jones, American basketball player and coach (d. 2014)
  1926   – Harry Dean Stanton, American actor, musician, and singer (d. 2017)
  1926   – Himayat Ali Shair, Urdu poet (d. 2019)
1927 – John Chancellor, American journalist (d. 1996)
  1927   – Mike Esposito, American author and illustrator (d. 2010)
1928 – Nancy Olson, American actress
  1928   – William Rees-Mogg, English journalist and public servant (d. 2012)
1930 – Polly Bergen, American actress and singer (d. 2014)
  1930   – Benoît Sinzogan, Beninese military officer and politician (d. 2021)
1931 – Jacqueline de Ribes, French fashion designer and philanthropist
1932 – Rosey Grier, American football player and actor
  1932   – Del Reeves, American country singer-songwriter (d. 2007)
1933 – Robert Bourassa, Canadian lawyer and politician, 22nd Premier of Quebec (d. 1996)
  1933   – Dumaagiin Sodnom, Mongolian politician; 13th Prime Minister of Mongolia
1936 – Robert F. Overmyer, American colonel, pilot, and astronaut (d. 1996)
1937 – Yoshiro Mori, Japanese journalist and politician, 55th Prime Minister of Japan
1938 – Jerry Rubin, American activist, author, and businessman (d. 1994)
  1938   – Tommy Vig, Hungarian vibraphone player, drummer, and composer
1939 – Karel Gott, Czech singer-songwriter and actor (d. 2019)
  1939   – George Edgar Slusser, American scholar and author (d. 2014)
1940 – Susan Howatch, English author and academic
1941 – Maulana Karenga, American philosopher, author, and activist, created Kwanzaa
  1941   – Andreas Khol, German-Austrian lawyer and politician
1942 – Javier Solana, Spanish physicist and politician, Spanish Minister of Foreign Affairs
1945 – Jim Gordon, American rock drummer and convicted murderer (d. 2023)
1946 – John Wood, Australian actor and screenwriter
1947 – John Blackman, Australian radio and television presenter 
  1947   – Claudia J. Kennedy, American general
  1947   – Salih Neftçi, Turkish economist and author (d. 2009)
  1947   – Navin Ramgoolam, Mauritius physician and politician, 3rd Prime Minister of Mauritius
1948 – Goodwill Zwelithini kaBhekuzulu, Zulu king (d. 2021)
1949 – Tommy Mottola, American businessman and music publisher 
1950 – Bruce Oldfield, English fashion designer
1960 – Anna Bligh, Australian politician, 37th Premier of Queensland
  1960   – Kyle Gass, American musician, comedian, and actor
  1960   – Angélique Kidjo, Beninese singer-songwriter, activist and actress
  1960   – Jane Lynch, American actress (Glee), comedian, author, and game show host
1961 – Jackie Earle Haley, American actor and director
1966 – Matthew Fox, American actor
1967 – Robin Ventura, American baseball player
1971 – Bubba Ray Dudley, American professional wrestler
1975 – Tim Hudson, American baseball player
1977 – Victoria, Crown Princess of Sweden
1984 – Samir Handanović, Slovenian footballer
1985 – Darrelle Revis, American football player
  1985   – Phoebe Waller-Bridge, English actress and screenwriter
1986 – Dan Smith, British singer, songwriter and record producer
1988 – Conor McGregor, Irish mixed martial artist
  1988   – Jérémy Stravius, French swimmer; winner of five gold medals in Olympic and world championship competitions

Deaths

Pre-1600
 664 – Eorcenberht, king of Kent
 809 – Otomo no Otomaro, Japanese general and Shogun  (b. 731)
 850 – Wei Fu, chancellor of the Tang Dynasty
 937 – Arnulf I, duke of Bavaria
1223 – Philip II, king of France (b. 1165)
1262 – Richard de Clare, 6th Earl of Gloucester, English soldier (b. 1222)
1486 – Margaret of Denmark, daughter of Christian I of Denmark (b. 1456)
1526 – John de Vere, 14th Earl of Oxford, English peer, landowner, and Lord Great Chamberlain of England (b. 1499)
1575 – Richard Taverner, English translator (b. 1505)

1601–1900
1614 – Camillus de Lellis, Italian priest and saint (b. 1550)
1723 – Claude Fleury, French historian and author (b. 1640)
1742 – Richard Bentley, English scholar and theologian (b. 1662)
1774 – James O'Hara, 2nd Baron Tyrawley, Irish field marshal (b. 1682)
1780 – Charles Batteux, French philosopher and academic (b. 1713)
1789 – Jacques de Flesselles, French politician (b. 1721)
  1789   – Bernard-René de Launay, French politician (b. 1740)
1790 – Ernst Gideon von Laudon, Austrian field marshal (b. 1717)
1809 – Nicodemus the Hagiorite, Greek monk and saint (b. 1749)
1816 – Francisco de Miranda, Venezuelan general (b. 1750)
1817 – Germaine de Staël, French philosopher and author (b. 1766)
1827 – Augustin-Jean Fresnel, French physicist and engineer, reviver of wave theory of light, inventor of catadioptric lighthouse lens (b. 1788)
1834 – Edmond-Charles Genêt, French-American diplomat (b. 1763)
1850 – August Neander, German historian and theologian (b. 1789)
1856 – Edward Vernon Utterson, English lawyer and historian (b. 1775)
1876 – John Buckley, English soldier, Victoria Cross recipient (b. 1813)
1881 – William H. Bonney aka Billy the Kid, American gunfighter and outlaw (b. 1859 or 1860)

1901–present
1904 – Paul Kruger, South African politician, 5th President of the South African Republic (b. 1824)
1907 – William Henry Perkin, English chemist and academic (b. 1838)
1910 – Marius Petipa, French dancer and choreographer (b. 1818)
1917 – Octave Lapize, French cyclist (b. 1887)
1918 – Quentin Roosevelt, American lieutenant and pilot (b. 1897)
1936 – Dhan Gopal Mukerji, Indian-American author and scholar (b. 1890)
1937 – Julius Meier, American businessman and politician, 20th Governor of Oregon (b. 1874)
1939 – Alphonse Mucha, Czech painter and illustrator (b. 1860)
1954 – Jacinto Benavente, Spanish author and playwright, Nobel Prize laureate (b. 1866)
1965 – Adlai Stevenson II, American soldier and politician, 5th United States Ambassador to the United Nations (b. 1900)
1966 – Julie Manet, French painter and art collector (b. 1878)
1967 – Tudor Arghezi, Romanian author and poet (b. 1880)
1968 – Konstantin Paustovsky, Russian author and poet (b. 1892)
1970 – Preston Foster, American actor (b. 1900)
1974 – Carl Spaatz, American World War II general; commander of the Strategic Air Forces in Europe (b. 1891)
1980 – Carlos López Moctezuma, Mexican actor (b. 1909).
1984 – Ernest Tidyman, American author and screenwriter; Academy Award winner for The French Connection (b. 1928)
1986 – Raymond Loewy, French-American industrial designer (b. 1893)
1991 – Constance Stokes, Australian painter (b. 1906)
1993 – Léo Ferré, Monacan singer-songwriter, pianist, and poet (b. 1916)
1998 – Richard McDonald, American businessman, co-founded McDonald's (b. 1909)
2000 – Pepo, Chilean cartoonist; creator of Condorito (b. 1911)
  2005   – Cicely Saunders, English hospice founder (b. 1918)
2017 – Maryam Mirzakhani, Iranian mathematician; only woman to win the Fields Medal (2014), the most prestigious award in mathematics (b. 1977)
2020 – Rosa, Spanish-born cow on French television (b. 2001)
2022 – Ivana Trump, Czech-American socialite and model (b. 1949)

Holidays and observances

 Christian feast day:
Boniface of Savoy
Gaspar de Bono
Camillus of Lellis (Roman Catholic Church, except in the United States)
Deusdedit of Canterbury
John Keble (Church of England)
Samson Occom (Episcopal Church (United States)
July 14 (Eastern Orthodox liturgics)
Bastille Day (France and dependencies)
International Non-Binary People's Day
Republic Day (Iraq)
Victoria Day (Sweden). The birthday of Crown Princess Victoria is an official flag flying day in Sweden.

References

External links

 
 
 

Days of the year
July